Soul Speak is the eighth studio album by American singer-songwriter Michael McDonald. The album was released on March 4, 2008, by Universal Music International and Motown.

Track listing

Personnel 

 Michael McDonald – lead vocals, acoustic piano (1, 8), backing vocals (3, 4), keyboards (4-7, 9-12), guitar (7)
 Toby Baker – keyboards (1, 2, 3, 5-8, 10-14), synthesizers (3), synthesizer programming (4)
 Tim Carmon – organ, acoustic piano (10)
 Tim Lauer – accordion (7)
 Doyle Bramhall II – guitar (1, 7-10, 12)
 Michael Thompson – guitar (1-7, 10-14), sitar (5)
 Nathan East – bass 
 Nicky Shaw – drum and percussion programming (1, 2, 3, 5, 6, 7, 9-14), arrangements (4, 11)
 Abe Laboriel Jr. – drums (1, 2, 3, 5, 6, 8, 10, 12, 13, 14)
 Vinnie Colaiuta – drums (7, 9) 
 Stevie Wonder – harmonica (6)
 Simon Climie – arrangements
 Nick Ingman – string arrangements and conductor (3, 6) 
 Isobel Griffiths – orchestra contractor (3, 6) 
 Gavyn Wright – orchestra leader (3, 6) 
 The Kick Horns – brass section (6, 7, 10)
 Michelle John Douglas – backing vocals (1, 2, 5, 6, 10, 12, 13)
 Rachel Oteh – backing vocals (1, 2, 10, 13)
 Drea Rheneé – backing vocals (1, 2, 3, 5, 6, 10, 13)
 Sharon White – backing vocals (1, 2, 5, 6, 10, 12, 13)
 Out For Souls Choir – choir (1, 2, 5, 10)
 Denise Allen – backing vocals (3, 6)
 Calvin Nowell – backing vocals (3, 6)
 Debi Selby – backing vocals (3)
 Aubrey Martells – backing vocals (4, 5, 11)
 Rian Peters – backing vocals (6)

Production 
 Producer – Simon Climie
 Executive Producer – Tony Swain
 Production Coordination – Debbie Johnson
 Project Coordination – Dee Harrington
 Engineers – Simon Climie, Alan Douglas, Shannon Forrest and Don Murray.
 Assistant Engineers – Brandon Dekora, Mo Hauzler, George Nixon, Phil Rose, Ken Takagashi and Grady Walker.
 ProTools Engineer – Joel Evenden
 Mixed by Mick Guzauski, assisted by Tom Bender.
 Mastered by Bob Ludwig at Gateway Mastering (Portland, ME).
 Creative Director – Sandra Brummels
 Art Direction and Design – Christopher Kornmann
 Photography – Danny Clinch

Charts

References

2008 albums
Michael McDonald (musician) albums